A Demon in My View  is a novel by British author Ruth Rendell. First published in 1976, it won the CWA Gold Dagger for Best Crime Novel of the Year, gaining Rendell the first of six Dagger awards she received during her career, more than any other writer.

Synopsis
A rigid man of fifty leads a solitary, apparently respectable life, as clerk and bookkeeper for a small business and part-time rent collector for his landlord. He has rented a flat in the building for twenty years because deep in its cellar, unbeknownst to anyone else, is a mannequin that he periodically "strangles" in order to satisfy his homicidal urges. The figure's location in the cellar, the darkness, the furtiveness, all are essential to the solitary man's satisfaction.  The tenuous mental equilibrium he has been able to maintain is threatened when a young man, healthy in mind and body, a doctoral candidate in psychology, becomes a roomer in the house.  Danger the older man senses from the moment the new tenant appears is horribly realized for him when the young man finds the mannequin and uses it as the figure in the bonfire at the Guy Fawkes Night celebration he has organized for the local children.  The respectable fifty-year-old now must go back to the streets to find flesh more yielding than a mannequin's...

Themes
Apart from its narrative momentum, as the lives of a disparate collection of lodgers in a down-at-heel rooming house fatally intertwine and unravel, the novel perceptively and accurately depicts "Kenbourne Vale" a fictional North West London suburb, during the 1970s public services strikes, with a shifting population, old terraced houses being demolished or cropped up into cheap rental warrens, grimy waste-ground and car-parks, Council housing estates, pretentiously named streets, cheap corner shops and kebab houses. It's a world of self-service launderettes, overflowing dustbins and neglected amenities. The novel is full of cool observation and irony, touching on sexism, feminism and racism (key social themes of the 1970s). The major irony is that an aggressively normal research graduate is writing a thesis on criminal psychopathy, sharing his surname and lodgings with a repressed psychopath; and his innocent, well-meant action forces the strangler out onto the streets in search of real victims again.

The novel also explores the nature of sexual love, obsession, and marital infidelity. The psychopath's sexual inadequacy and homicidal urges are shown to be the result of a loveless, repressed upbringing by a maiden aunt. The research writer is engaged in a passionate affair with a married woman and is allowing her a period of separation to decide whether or not to leave her husband for him. The lodging house also contains a series of individuals or couples engaged in ironically paralleled marital, sexual and social relationships that often appear exploitative, inadequate or shabby. By contrast, the researcher and his lover, and a couple of his Caribbean friends, come together during the book, in relationships that offer a positive alternative to the general dysfunction of the other characters' relationships and values.

All these skilfully interwoven strands come together, with explosive results, in Ruth Rendell's brilliantly characteristic trademark manner.

Film version
The novel was made into a film, also titled , in 1991. It starred Anthony Perkins and was also set in London.

Notes

1976 British novels
Novels by Ruth Rendell
Hutchinson (publisher) books
British novels adapted into films